"Glasgow Rangers (Nine in a Row)" was a single released by the Scottish football team Rangers in 1997 to celebrate their achievement of winning nine consecutive national league titles. It reached number 54 in the UK Singles Chart.

References

 

1997 singles
Rangers F.C. songs
1997 in Scotland
1997 in Scottish sport
Football songs and chants